Notte Magica - A Tribute to the Three Tenors is the fourth live album by Italian operatic pop trio Il Volo, with the participation of Plácido Domingo as a performer and conductor. The recording was released worldwide on September 30, 2016 by Sony Masterworks.
It peaked at number 1 on the Billboard Top Classical Albums and it was certified platinum in Italy by  the Federazione Industria Musicale Italiana.

Recording
The album was recorded on July 1, 2016 at the Il Volo concert in Piazza Santa Croce in Florence with the orchestra of the Teatro Massimo di Palermo. It pays tribute to The Three Tenors on the occasion of the twenty-sixth anniversary of their iconic first concert held on the eve of the Italia '90 World Cup and features a selection of the repertoire performed by Domingo, Pavarotti and Carreras during their tournées, including popular Neapolitan songs, Italian and international classics, themes from musicals and classical opera arias.
Plácido Domingo himself took part in the concert, conducting the orchestra in eight pieces, with Maestro Marcello Rota alternating as conductor, and joining the trio to sing "Non ti scordar di me". The project was also supported by the Luciano Pavarotti Foundation.

Promotion 
Il Volo began to promote the album in September 2016, performing "Nessun Dorma" on NBC's America's Got Talent Season 11 finale, joined on stage by AGT contestants Laura Bretan, Sofie Dossi and Viktor Kee.

Shortly before the release of the album, the audio version of "My Way" exclusively premiered on Billboard magazine's official website on September 14, 2016 and the audio version of "Maria" on broadwayworld.com on September 22, 2016. On September 28, 2016 People magazine's website shared an exclusive first look at "Granada" video.

The trio performed the bonus track "Adeste Fideles" on NBC's Today Show in New York City on December 23, 2016 and came back to the show on March 3, 2017 to perform "Nessun Dorma", just before starting their Notte Magica World Tour from the Radio City Music Hall on March 4.

Track listing

Standard Edition

Deluxe Edition

Personnel
Il Volo
 Piero Barone – vocals (tenor)
 Ignazio Boschetto – vocals (tenor)
 Gianluca Ginoble – vocals (baritone)

Additional musicians
 Plácido Domingo - conductor (on "La forza del destino", "Nessun dorma", "Granada", "Una furtiva lagrima", "E lucevan le stelle", "En aranjuez con tu amor", "No puede ser", "Libiamo ne' lieti calici"), vocals (in "Non ti scordar di me")
 Marcello Rota - conductor
 Orchestra del Teatro Massimo di Palermo - orchestra
 Schola Cantorum Labronica - choir (in "Nessun dorma", "Libiamo ne' lieti calici", "Adeste Fideles")
 Maurizio Preziosi – choir conductor
 Coro delle voci bianche della scuola musica di Fiesole - choir (in "Mamma")
 Joan Yakkey - choir conductor

Production and technical

 Michele Torpedine - producer
 Maurizio Maggi – audio recording engineer
 Matteo Maddalena - audio recording engineer
 Luciano Serena - mastering, mixing, sound supervision
 Giampiero Grani - arranger, orchestration (on "La danza", "Torna a Surriento", "Core ‘ngrato", "My Way", "Tonight", "’O surdato ‘nnammurato", "Cielito lindo", "’O sole mio"), musical consultant
 Diego Basso - arranger, orchestration (on "Mattinata", "Mamma")
 Chris Walden - arranger, orchestration (on "Maria")
 Fabrizio Francia - arranger, orchestration (on "Non ti scordar di me")
 Vincenzo Anselmi - arranger, orchestration (on "Non ti scordar di me")
 Celso Valli - producer, arranger (on "Ave Maria, Mater Misericordiae")
 Marco Borsatti - engineer, mixing (on "Ave Maria, Mater Misericordiae")
 Giordano Mazzi - editing, programming (on "Ave Maria, Mater Misericordiae")
 Giovanni Gastel - photography
 Angelo Trani - live photography
 Daniela Boccadoro - artwork
 Cristian Biondani - director
 Eugene O’Connor - director of photography
 John McCullagh - director of photography
 Max Bettoni - producer
 Fabio Battistin – producer
 Mirko Serino - editor
 Francesco De Cave - show designer
 Igor Ronchese - set designer
 Alessio Guerrieri - stage manager
 Fabio Venturi - live sound engineer
 Enrico Belli - live sound engineer
 Andrea Tesini - monitor engineer

Charts

Certifications

References 

2016 live albums
Il Volo albums
Operatic pop albums